() is a municipality ('Einheitsgemeinde') in the district of Harburg, in Lower Saxony, Germany. It changed its name on December 11, 1964 from ″Wulmstorf″ to ″Neu Wulmstorf″. It is part of the Hamburg Metropolitan Region.

The municipality of Neu Wulmstorf consists of:
 New Wulmstorf, consisting of
 New Wulmstorf
 Wulmstorf
 Daerstorf
 Elstorf, consisting of
 Elstorf
 Ardestorf
 Elstorf-Bachheide
 Rade consisting of
 Rade
 Mienenbüttel
 Ohlenbüttel
 Rübke
 Schwiederstorf.

Geography
Neu Wulmstorf is situated between Hamburg in the east, the marsh of the Altes Land in the north, the forest of the Harburg Hills (Harburger Berge) in the south east, Buchholz in der Nordheide and the geest to the south, and Buxtehude to the west. The municipality incorporates eleven villages and most of the area marks the north north west outskirts of the larger natural region of the Lüneburg Heath in North Germany.

 The landscape is dominated by the transition from the marsh in the north to the geest in south east. On the marsh side lies the village of Rübke in the Lower Saxon Elbe marshes at sea level and the nature reserve (Naturschutzgebiet) Moore bei Buxtehude (mire), which is home to the corn crake.

The village of Neu Wulmstorf sits right on the transitions from the mire up to the geest.

Further up, the villages Wulmstorf, Daerstorf, Schwiederstorf, Rade are marking the highest elevations of Neu Wulmstorf on the western outskirts of the Harburg Hills.

The villages of Ardestorf, Elstorf, Bachheide, Rade, Mienenbüttel and Ohlenbüttel lie on a stretch reaching from the north east to the south end of the municipality.

Population
On December 31, 2013 there were 20,384 registered people living in Neu Wulmstorf. The population roughly doubled during the past 42 years. See below for the development of the population (all on December 31):

Infrastructure
The relatively young village of Neu Wulmstorf grew at the intersection of two old trails. The main road connecting Rübke in the marsh with the geest villages of Wulmstorf and Elstorf intersects with the Bundesstraße 73 as the main road connecting Stade and Cuxhaven with Hamburg. It dominates the settlement as it cuts through from east to west. Just before the geest, the Lower Elbe Railway marked the north border of the Neu Wulmstorf village for many years, with the Neu Wulmstorf S-Bahn station. The station bore the name Daerstorf before that village including the exclave on which the station was built upon, got incorporated into Neu Wulmstorf.

Another axis is the connection from Buxtehude to Buchholz. The first stretch of the Bundesstraße 3, intersects with the Bundesautobahn 1 at the south tip of the municipality.

Transportation
Neu Wulmstorf is serviced by the rapid transit system of the city train of Hamburg with the station Neu Wulmstorf. Bus service connects Neu Wulmstorf to Hamburg-Neugraben.

Education
Neu Wulmstorf has three primary schools. Secondary schools are the Hauptschule Vossbarg, the Realschule Vierkaten and the Gymnasium Neu Wulmstorf.

Sports
Neu Wulmstorf has several sporting areas including a sports centre with swimming hall in the centre of the village.
These clubs provide a rich sports life:
 TVV Neu Wulmstorf
 TSV Elstorf
 BSC Neu Wulmstorf
 Schützenverein Neu Wulmstorf
 DLRG

Twin town
  Nyergesújfalu, Hungary

References

Harburg (district)